Hahnaman is an unincorporated community in Whiteside County, in the U.S. state of Illinois.

History
The Hahnaman post office closed in 1920. The community was named from its location in Hahnaman Township.

References

Unincorporated communities in Whiteside County, Illinois
Unincorporated communities in Illinois